The Jesus Lizard is the third EP by The Jesus Lizard. It was released in 1998 on Jetset Records. The album features songs produced by Andy Gill, Jim O'Rourke and former The Velvet Underground member John Cale. It is their only LP or EP release without a four-letter title.

Track listing
 "Cold Water" - 2:49
 "Inflicted by Hounds" - 3:30
 "Eyesore" - 2:47
 "Valentine" - 4:23
 "Needles for Teeth" - 3:48

References

1998 EPs
The Jesus Lizard albums
Albums produced by John Cale
Albums produced by Andy Gill
Albums produced by Jim O'Rourke (musician)
Jetset Records albums